Staré pověsti české can refer to:

 Staré pověsti české - an 1894 book by Alois Jirásek known in English as "Ancient Bohemian Legends"
 Staré pověsti české (film) - the puppet animation film adaptation by Jiri Trnka